National Road 706 is a road running through Trondheim, Norway. It runs from the E6 at Sluppen, runs along Osloveien and then the Marienborg Tunnel to Ilsvika, then runs through Nordre avlastningsvei, including the Ilsvika Tunnel and the Skansen Tunnel, across Nidelv Bridge before following Haakon VII's gate until reaching the E6 at Rotvoll.

 
706
Roads in Trondheim
2010 establishments in Norway